The 1990–91 Hellenic Football League season was the 38th in the history of the Hellenic Football League, a football competition in England.

Premier Division

The Premier Division featured 14 clubs which competed in the division last season, along with four new clubs:
Banbury United, relegated from Southern Football League
Carterton Town, promoted from Division One
Milton United, promoted from Division One
Hounslow, demoted from the Southern Football League

League table

Division One

Division One featured 13 clubs which competed in the division last season, along with three new clubs:
Cinderford Town, joined from the Gloucestershire County League
North Leigh, joined from the Witney and District League
Supermarine, relegated from the Premier Division

Also, The Herd changed name to Cirencester United.

League table

References

External links
 Hellenic Football League

1990-91
8